Intimate Power may refer to:

Intimate Power (Pouvoir intime), a Canadian film released in 1986,
an alternate title for the 1989 film The Favorite.